Rady Mom (born 1970) is an American politician and a representative in the Massachusetts House of Representatives, representing the 18th Middlesex district. The district was formerly represented by Kevin Murphy, who vacated his seat in 2014 when he was hired as the city manager of Lowell.  Mom is the first Cambodian-American to be elected to the Massachusetts state Legislature as well as the first Cambodian American elected to a state legislature in the country.

Early life and education 
Born in Pailin, Cambodia in 1970, the son of a ruby miner.  When he was 10, his family was sent to a refugee camp by the Khmer Rouge.  According to Mom, his entire family was on a list to be executed. Rady and his family emigrated to America in 1982, when he was 12, sponsored by the Chester Park United Methodist Church in Duluth, Minnesota.  In 1984 they moved to Lowell, Massachusetts.  Mom became an American Citizen in 1990. He attended Middlesex Community College. Rady, an acupressure therapist, owns Mom's Therapy & Herbal Center in Lowell, MA.  Before going to college he became a Buddhist Monk.  His grandfather was the high priest at the Lowell Glory Buddhist Temple.  He is married to Sirady.  They have four children: Justin, Joee, Amelia and Allyanna.

Mom is a graduate of Middlesex Community College and in 2015 received the Distinguished Alumni Award at commencement.  In 2005 he ran and lost the race for Lowell City Council.

Elections

2014 
Mom defeated independent Fred Bahou in the 2014 Massachusetts general election with 3,847 votes, 61.7% of the vote.  His election made him the first new state representative for Lowell in 15 years.

2016 
The 2016 election marked the first time three Cambodian-American candidates faced off for a state legislature position. Mom ran against Republican Kamara Kay, in the general election, and Cheth Khim, in the Democratic Primary in a bid to keep his seat in the Massachusetts House. Mom faced heavy opposition, with a large part of the local Cambodian-American constituency disliking Mom's association with Hun Manet, who visited Lowell in May, 2016. Mom won the primary election with 51% of the vote and went on to be reelected by a landslide victory over Kay.

Committee assignments 
 Joint Committee on Education
 Joint Committee on Election Laws
 Joint Committee on Public Safety and Homeland Security
 Joint Committee on Telecommunications, Utilities and Energy

See also
 2019–2020 Massachusetts legislature
 2021–2022 Massachusetts legislature

References

External links 
 Campaign website

Living people
American people of Cambodian descent
Cambodian emigrants to the United States
Middlesex Community College (Massachusetts) alumni
Democratic Party members of the Massachusetts House of Representatives
Asian-American people in Massachusetts politics
Politicians from Lowell, Massachusetts
21st-century American politicians
1970 births